Ken Martin (born July 17, 1973) is an American political figure from Minnesota. He is currently Chairman of the Minnesota Democratic-Farmer-Labor (DFL) Party, President of the Association of State Democratic Committees, and a Vice Chair of the Democratic National Committee.

Personal life 
Martin lives in Eagan, Minnesota with his wife Jennifer O’Rourke and two sons,. He is active in youth sports in Eagan where he has served on the Eagan Athletic Association Board of Directors and as the President of the Eagan Basketball Association.

Early life and education 
Martin was born in Minneapolis, Minnesota on July 17, 1973. He attended Eden Prairie High School and graduated from the University of Kansas in 1996 with Bachelor of Arts degrees in Political Science and History.  Martin's deep involvement in student government and campus life led to Chancellor Robert Hemenway presenting him with the Donald K. Alderson Memorial Award, which recognizes a graduating senior whose campus involvement as a student benefits fellow students and the greater good.

Career 
Martin started his political work in 1990 as an intern for Minnesota U.S. Senator Paul Wellstone's campaign and later interned in his official office. In 1992, Martin organized college campuses throughout the South for the Clinton/Gore Campaign. After college, he worked in Kansas politics helping with the Kansas Democratic Coordinated Campaign as Field Director for the Kansas Democratic Party.

In 1998, Martin moved back to his home state of Minnesota and served as the Political & Field Director for the Minnesota Democratic-Farmer-Labor (DFL) Party. He served as the Deputy Minnesota State Director for the Gore campaign in 2000 and in 2002 was the campaign manager for Secretary of State candidate Buck Humphrey. In 2004, Martin helped manage John Kerry's Presidential campaign in Minnesota.

From 2001 to 2005, Martin served as the Policy Aide for Ramsey County Commissioner Susan Haigh. In 2005, he served as the Executive Assistant to Minnesota Attorney General Mike Hatch and then went on to help run his campaign for Governor in 2006.

Working with the North Central States Regional Council of Carpenters, Martin led an effort on behalf of the Building Trades to pass prevailing wage ordinances with local governments throughout Minnesota. 

In 2008, Martin led the campaign that passed the Clean Water, Land and Legacy Amendment (Legacy Amendment) to the Minnesota Constitution which to this day is still one of the largest conservation finance measures to pass in our nation's history as well as one of the highest vote-getters on a Minnesota ballot.

Martin later served as the Executive Director of WIN Minnesota, a Minnesota-based donor collaborative that helped develop, fund and direct independent expenditures during the 2010 election cycle. After the election, Governor Mark Dayton tapped Martin to direct Dayton's successful recount effort, ushering in Minnesota's first Democratic Governor in 24 years.

Following the successful 2010 campaign, Governor Mark Dayton asked Martin to serve as the Chairman of the Minnesota Democratic-Farmer-Labor Party where he was elected unanimously in February 2011. In 2017, Martin was elected by his peers throughout the nation as the President of the Association of State Democratic Committees and became a Vice Chair of the Democratic National Committee.

Minnesota DFL Party Chair 

Martin is currently serving his 6th term as chairman of the Democratic-Farmer-Labor Party (DFL), the Minnesota branch of the Democratic Party. He has held this post since 2011—making him the longest-serving chairman in the 75-year history of the DFL.

When Martin was elected DFL Party Chair in 2011, he inherited a state party deeply in debt  following significant election losses including losing the majority in the State Senate for the first time in 40 years, the majority in the House of Representatives, and one of the longest held Democratic seats in Congress in MN-08 with the defeat of Congressman Jim Oberstar.

The DFL won in the 2012 Minnesota election, gaining back majorities in both the state House and state Senate. In this election, Minnesota became the first state to defeat a Constitutional Amendment to ban same-sex marriage and stopped a Voter ID Amendment. Plus, Congressman Rick Nolan gained the MN-08 Congressional seat.

The 2014 cycle brought additional success as the Minnesota DFL reelected, by large margins, two office holders in Governor Mark Dayton and U.S. Senator Al Franken who each won their first elections by less than 1% of the vote.

During the 2016 elections, Minnesota was one of only two Midwestern states to vote for the Democratic presidential nominee Hillary Clinton. In addition, despite losses of rural congressional seats throughout the country, the Minnesota DFL won all three of its rural congressional races by reelecting Congressman Tim Walz (MN-01), Congressman Collin Petersen (MN-07), and Congressman Rick Nolan (MN-08). 

In 2018, the Minnesota DFL elected Tim Walz as Governor, marking the first time the DFL has had three consecutive terms in the Governor's office. In addition, the DFL won every constitutional office, won back the majority in the State House of Representatives, flipped two congressional seats from red-to-blue, one of those seats being represented by the Republicans by over forty years, and elected two women to the U.S. Senate, Senator Amy Klobuchar and Senator Tina Smith, becoming only the fifth state in the nation to be represented by two women in the U.S. Senate simultaneously. 

After coming within 1.5% of winning Minnesota in 2016, Donald Trump's campaign heavily invested in winning Minnesota in 2020. These investments included millions in advertising and over 60 campaign staffers. With the DFL's influence, the Democratic nominee Joe Biden won with 52.40% of the vote to Trump's 45.28%. The DFL Party, under Martin's leadership, also succeeded in re-electing Senator Tina Smith, holding the State House of Representatives, holding the two congressional seats the party flipped from red to blue in 2018, and flipping three Republican-held State Senate seats.

Martin was re-elected to his sixth term as Chairman of the Democratic-Farmer-Labor Party on February 6, 2021. In their coverage of his re-election, the Star Tribune noted that "Martin's party is coming off a string of statewide election wins, and more than $130 million raised compared to the state Republican Party's $45 million during his 10-year tenure." The Star Tribune also noted that, as of Martin's re-election, "the Minnesota DFL Party has $2.5 million in the bank compared to $55,000 on the GOP side".

DNC Vice Chair 
In 2017, Martin was elected by his peers throughout the country as the President of the Association of State Democratic Chairs (ASDC), and by that election became a Vice Chair of the Democratic National Committee (DNC). On January 21, Martin was unanimously re-elected President of the ASDC. Upon his re-election, Martin pledged to continue "our important work of strengthening Democratic infrastructure across America."

References 

Living people
Minnesota Democrats
People from Eagan, Minnesota
State political party chairs of Minnesota
University of Kansas alumni
1973 births